Ghosthunters is a 2016 American direct-to-video horror film written and directed by Pearry Reginald Teo. The film stars Francesca Santoro, Stephen Manley and David O'Donnell. The film was released by The Asylum on July 5, 2016. In the tradition of The Asylum's catalog, Ghosthunters is a mockbuster of the 2016 film reboot Ghostbusters.

Plot 
A group of paranormal investigators, Neal, Henry, Jessica, Neal's girlfriend Amy, and Jessica's girlfriend Devon, have arrived at a house where Henry's wife and daughter were murdered by a serial killer known only as the Night Stalker. The team hopes to free the pair's souls via a device created by Neal, which can capture ghosts and seal them in containers. As the investigation proceeds Devon leaves and is killed by a floating knife while another Amy experiences a series of visions. These visions not only show her the deaths of Henry's wife and daughter, but also reveal that Henry is the Night Stalker. Henry had murdered them as part of a paranormal experiment, in the hopes that their extreme distress would amplify paranormal energy. Amy manages to get a recording of Henry confessing to the murders, an action that ends with Henry shooting Neal with a gun he was carrying with him. Amy and Jessica flee, but are caught by Henry. They are almost shot, but are spared when the ghost of Henry's wife appears and distracts him long enough for Jessica to break the containers of ectoplasm. The now released ghosts attack Henry, killing him and giving Amy and Jessica a chance to escape - only for Jessica to get shot and die. The film ends with Amy, the sole survivor of the night's events, leaving the house as police arrive.

Cast
 Francesca Santoro as Amy
 Stephen Manley as Henry
 David O'Donnell as Neal
 Liz Fenning as Jessica
 Web Crystal as Devon
 Phyllis Spielman as Martha
 Anna Harr as Gabby
 Kim Shannon as Sally
 Aaron Moses as Stanley
 Kris Marconi as Officer Mack

Release 
The films was released direct-to-video on July 5, 2016 in the United States.

Reception
HorrorNews.net reviewed the movie, criticizing it for a lack of logic and sense while stating that "In the end, though, horror fans tend to prioritize tension and dread over lucidity, and if you are willing to make that tradeoff, Ghosthunters can be oddly satisfying."

References

External links
 
 
 

2016 films
2016 horror films
American supernatural horror films
American direct-to-video films
The Asylum films
2010s English-language films
Films directed by Pearry Reginald Teo
2010s American films